Christiana Lindsey House is a historic home located at Mercer, Mercer County, Pennsylvania.  It was built in 1881, and is a -story, brick residence with a 2-story rear ell in the Italianate style. It measures 34 feet wide and 39 feet deep. It sits on a raised ashlar sandstone foundation and has a slate covered truncated hipped roof. It features an elaborately detailed full-width front porch.  Also on the property is a contributing summer kitchen, built about 1881.

It was added to the National Register of Historic Places in 1998.

References

Houses on the National Register of Historic Places in Pennsylvania
Italianate architecture in Pennsylvania
Houses completed in 1881
Houses in Mercer County, Pennsylvania
National Register of Historic Places in Mercer County, Pennsylvania
1881 establishments in Pennsylvania